Malatipur  is a  Kolkata Suburban Railway  station on the Barasat–Hasnabad line. It is located in North 24 Parganas district in the Indian state of West Bengal.

History
Barasat Basirhat Railway constructed a  narrow-gauge line in 1914 as a part of Martin's Light Railways. The line was closed in 1955.

Layout

See also

References

External links 

 Malatipur Station Map

Railway stations in North 24 Parganas district
Kolkata Suburban Railway stations